Chacewater, Kenwyn and Baldhu was an electoral division of Cornwall in the United Kingdom which returned one member to sit on Cornwall Council between 2013 and 2021. It was abolished at the 2021 local elections, being succeeded by Gloweth, Malabar and Shortlanesend, Threemilestone and Chacewater and Feock and Kea.

Councillors

Extent
The division represented Shortlanesend, Saveock, Chacewater, Twelveheads, Baldhu, Kea and parts of Kenwyn, covering 5030 hectares in total.

Election results

2017 election

2013 election

References

Electoral divisions of Cornwall Council